The Etruscan alphabet was the alphabet used by the Etruscans, an ancient civilization of central and northern Italy, to write their language, from about 700 BC to sometime around 100 AD.

The Etruscan alphabet derives from the Euboean alphabet used in the Greek colonies in southern Italy which belonged to the "western" ("red") type, the so-called Western Greek alphabet. Several Old Italic scripts, including the Latin alphabet, derived from it (or simultaneously with it).

Origins
The Etruscan alphabet originated as an adaptation of the Euboean alphabet used by the Euboean Greeks in their first colonies in Italy, the island of Pithekoussai and the city of Cumae in Campania.

The earliest known Etruscan abecedarium is inscribed on the frame of a wax tablet in ivory, measuring 8.8×5 cm, found at Marsiliana (near Grosseto, Tuscany). It dates from about 700 BC, and lists 26 letters corresponding to contemporary forms of the Greek alphabet, including digamma, san and qoppa, but not omega which had still not been added at the time.

Letters

The shapes of the Archaic Etruscan and Neo-Etruscan letters had a few variants, used in different places and/or in different epochs. Shown above are the glyphs from the Unicode Old Italic block, whose appearance will depend on the font used by the browser. These are oriented as they would be in lines written from left to right. Also shown are SVG images of variants shown as they would be written right to left, as in most of the actual inscriptions.

Development

The archaic form of the Etruscan alphabet remained practically unchanged from its origin in the 8th century BC until about 600 BC, and the direction of writing was free. From the 6th century BC, however, the alphabet evolved, adjusting to the phonology of the Etruscan language, and letters representing phonemes nonexistent in Etruscan were dropped. By 400 BC, it appears that all of Etruria was using the classical Etruscan alphabet of 20 letters, mostly written from right to left.

An additional sign , in shape similar to the numeral 8, transcribed as F, was present in Lydian, Neo-Etruscan and in Italic alphabets of Osco-Umbrian languages such as Oscan, Umbrian, Old Sabine and South Picene (Old Volscian). This sign was introduced in Etruscan around 600-550 BC and was not present in the Marsiliana tablet, the earliest example of the Etruscan alphabet. If previously it was thought that the sign  may have been an altered B or H or an ex novo creation, or even an Etruscan invention, an early Sabellian inscription suggests that it is instead an invention of speakers of a Sabellian language (Osco-Umbrian languages). Some letters were, on the other hand, falling out of use. Etruscan did not have any voiced stops, for which B, C, D were originally intended (and  respectively). The B and D therefore fell out of use, and the C, which is simpler and easier to write than K, was adopted to write , mostly displacing K itself. Likewise, since Etruscan had no  vowel sound, O disappeared and was replaced by U.  In the course of its simplification, the redundant letters showed some tendency towards a semi-syllabary: C, K and Q were predominantly used in the contexts CE, KA, QU.

This classical alphabet remained in use until the 2nd century BC when it began to be influenced by the rise of the Latin alphabet. Soon after, the Etruscan language itself became extinct — so thoroughly that its vocabulary and grammar are still only partly known, in spite of more than a century of intense research.

Legacy
The Etruscan alphabet apparently was the immediate ancestor for the Latin alphabet, as well as of several Old Italic scripts used in Italy before the rise of Rome, such as those used in the Oscan, Umbrian, Lepontic, Rhaetian (or Raetic), Venetic, Messapian, North and South Picene, and Camunic inscriptions.

Gallery

See also
 Etruscan numerals
 Old Italic scripts

References

Alphabet
Alphabets
7th-century BC establishments in Italy
1st-century disestablishments in Italy